João Alexandre Santos Vilacova (born 29 November 1973), known as Alexandre, is a Portuguese retired footballer who played as a central defender.

Club career
Alexandre was born in Porto. Brought through the ranks of Varzim SC, he only knew one club throughout his professional career, which spanned almost two decades, also being the Póvoa de Varzim-based side's longtime captain. Almost always in the starting XI, he played three editions of the Primeira Liga with them (totalling 89 matches and going scoreless in the process), but spent the vast majority of his career in the second division.

For 2009–10, after 26 years at the Estádio do Varzim SC, Alexandre signed with A.D. Esposende of the Braga regional leagues, helping it return to the fourth level in his first season. He began his coaching career precisely with the latter team.

In January 2014, Alexandre was named interim manager at Varzim after the third-tier side dismissed José Augusto due to poor results. He then worked with the club as director of football, leaving his post on 15 June 2019.

References

External links

1973 births
Living people
Footballers from Porto
Portuguese footballers
Association football defenders
Primeira Liga players
Liga Portugal 2 players
Segunda Divisão players
Varzim S.C. players
A.D. Esposende players
Portuguese football managers
Varzim S.C. managers